Eimbert Timmermans (born 24 October 1961) is a retired Dutch sidecarcross rider and double World Champion.

He has also won the Dutch national sidecarcross championship four times, in 1986, 1989, 1990 and 1992. All his successes were achieved with Eric Verhagen as his passenger.

Biography
After the end of his sidecarcross career in 1992, Eimbert Timmermans opened a transport company, Timtrans, whose director he is.

He continues to be involved in motor sport, having taken part in the 2009 Dakar Rally as a mechanic in the truck category.

Sidecarcross world championship results
Eimbert Timmermans's first success as a sidecarcross rider came in 1986, when he took out the Dutch national championship, together with Eric Verhagen. This season was also his first in the sidecarcross world championship, where the team finished sixteen's, with two seventh place race finishes as their best results.

After similar results in 1987, the team greatly improved in 1988, coming fifth in the world championship and taking out their first race win in the Dutch GP. After continuing good results in 1989 and 1990 and two more Dutch national championships, the team managed to take out their first world championship in 1991.

The following season, 1992, saw a repeat of the world championship and also a fourth Dutch title. Timmermans retired from the competition after that, as did Eric Verhagen.

He returned for six races in 1995 with passenger Andre Visser but had limited success and did not race in the world championship again.

Season by season

Source:

Honours

World Championship
 Champions: (2) 1991, 1992

Netherlands
 Champions: (4) 1986, 1989, 1990, 1992

References

External links
 Eimbert Timmermans company website 
 The World Championship on Sidecarcross.com

1961 births
Living people
Dutch sidecarcross riders
Sportspeople from 's-Hertogenbosch